Kurtziella powelli is a species of sea snail, a marine gastropod mollusk in the family Mangeliidae.

Description
The length of the shell attains 5.1 mm, its diameter 2 mm.

Distribution
This marine species occurs off the Baja California, Mexico.

References

 Shasky, Ten New Species of Tropical Eastern Pacific Turridae; The Veliger 1972

External links
  Tucker, J.K. 2004 Catalog of recent and fossil turrids (Mollusca: Gastropoda). Zootaxa 682:1–1295.
 

powelli
Gastropods described in 1971